The 1953 South Dakota State Jackrabbits football team was an American football team that represented South Dakota State University in the North Central Conference during the 1953 college football season. In its seventh season under head coach Ralph Ginn, the team compiled a 5–3–1 record (5–0–1 against conference opponents), won the NCC championship, and outscored opponents by a total of 247 to 186.

Schedule

References

South Dakota State
South Dakota State Jackrabbits football seasons
North Central Conference football champion seasons
South Dakota State Jackrabbits football